Stelis piestopus is a species of flowering plant in the family Orchidaceae, native to Peru. It was first described by Rudolf Schlechter in 1921.

References

piestopus
Flora of Peru
Plants described in 1921